The Holy Quran with English translation and commentary  is a 5 volume commentary of the Quran published in 1963 by the Ahmadiyya Muslim Community. It was prepared by a board of translators consisting of  Maulvi Sher Ali,  Mirza Bashir Ahmad  and  Malik Ghulam Farid.

This 5 Volume  Commentary covers  about 3,000 pages with an Introduction by Mirza Basheer-ud-Din Mahmood Ahmad, the Second Caliph of the Ahmadiyya movement. The Commentary is largely based upon the earlier volumes of the Urdu Tafsir Saghir, the 10 Volumes Tafsir Kabeer and unpublished notes of Mahmood Ahmad. The Introduction to the Study of the Holy Qur'an by Mahmood Ahmad, has been published as an independent work as well. In 1968, a single Volume  abridged Edition was also published. The Arabic Text of the book has been given side by side with the English Translation, followed by a system of Cross-references and Notes.

Background and purpose
In the introduction to the work, stating the need for a modern English commentary, Mirza Mahmood Ahmad explained that all the large and systematic commentaries were in Arabic and thus of little use to those who cannot read the Quran in Arabic. Explanatory notes to their translations by non-Muslim authors had been influenced by writers who were prejudiced towards Islam. Moreover, these authors themselves knew little if any Arabic thus lacking access to the larger, more reliable commentaries and relying instead on the minor and more popular ones. Likewise, European translators and commentators seem not to have made a close study of the Quran itself, a necessary step in comprehending it by gaining an insight into its terminology, idiom and fundamentals from which its content derives its significance.

He also explained that the emergence of new sciences –  which expose any book that professes to give a teaching to new criticism – merited a commentary of the Quran in light of new knowledge. Secondly, when the earliest commentaries of the Quran were written, the Bible had not been translated into Arabic, therefore when discussing parts of the Quran containing references to Biblical narratives, the commentators often relied on what they had heard from Jewish and Christian scholars, or on their own speculations, with later European writers on Islam attributing their mistakes to the Quran. Now when knowledge of the Bible had become common and with Arabic, Latin and Greek works being accessible to Muslim scholars, new avenues for understanding the parts of the Quran which contain references to the Bible or the Mosaic tradition had been made available. Thirdly, he stated that inter-religious controversies had hitherto largely revolved around matters of belief and ritual rather than those of moral and socio-political ideas or economic relations and that the contemporary world thought more in terms of these practical matters. A commentary dealing with such practical teachings of the Quran was therefore necessary. Fourthly, according to Mahmood Ahmad, the Quran contained prophecies and those prophecies which had been fulfilled up until the time of this commentary, constituted an important part of the evidence that the Quran was the revealed word of God. Fifthly, the Quran dealt with beliefs and teachings found in all other religions and ideologies, incorporating their best parts and pointing to their weaknesses and deficiencies. Earlier commentators were unaware of the teachings of these religions and ideologies and therefore unable to fully appreciate Quranic teachings regarding them. Now that all the most obscure teachings have become easily accessible and better known, a more comparative approach to the Quran vis-a-vis other religions and ideologies is possible which also demanded a new commentary.

System of translation and commentary
The authors explain to have adopted a three-fold scheme for translating and interpreting the Arabic words and expressions. First, interpreting an expression in the light of a corroborative testimony of the Quranic idiom itself. Secondly, the ‘context’ of a word or expression, which determines the meaning. Thirdly, meanings and explanations in the standard lexicons of the Arabic language, such as the Lisan al-Arab, the Taj al-'Arus, the Mufradat of Imam Raghib, the Arabic English Lexicon by E. W. Lane and the Aqrab al-Mawarud etc. Words in italics have been placed to further explain/qualify the meaning of the text. The verses have been interpreted by appending notes to them which are serially numbered throughout the Commentary. It is claimed these notes derive their authority from the spirit and tenor of the Quran. A concordance has been created to enable search for the same or similar expressions/concepts at other places of the Quran. In transliterating Arabic words, the system adopted by the Royal Asiatic Society has been followed.

In explaining difficult places or expressions, the authors, according to the Ahmadiyya beliefs, have adopted an order of precedence: Quran having precedence over Hadith, after the Hadith, the Arab Lexicons, and then the factual evidence of historical events. The authors believe, the Chapters (Surahs) in the Quran, have a natural order, which also runs through the verses of each Chapter. At the beginning of each Chapter, an introduction has been given, explaining the main subject of the Chapter, the Chronology of Revelation and the questions of how every Chapter is linked to the previous one. It is claimed the Quran forms a thoroughly coherent and consistent reading. The verses of the various Chapters, and the specific position of each Chapter itself is governed by an intelligent order. The Notes, it is claimed, have been placed to refute the principal objections raised against Islam by non-Muslim critics. It is claimed that such objections were based upon ignorance or deliberate misinterpretation of the teachings of Islam. Such objections have been refuted with the intent to remove the bias and prejudice against Islam, and make a better understanding of its teachings possible. The Commentary has a system of cross-references, placed below the Text and the Translation. These give, at a glance, the various places where the subject of a particular verse has been dealt with in the Quran.

See also

 Tafseer-e-Kabeer

References

External links
Full commentary 1968 version

In 5 volumes (1963):
Volume 1 
Volume 2 
Volume 3 
Volume 4
Volume 5

English translations of the Quran
Islamic theology books
Ahmadiyya literature
1963 non-fiction books
Ahmadi tafsir